The following is a list of Women's National Basketball Association (WNBA) players.

A

Farhiya Abdi 
Tajama Abraham
Svetlana Abrosimova 
Natalie Achonwa 
Jessica Adair
Danielle Adams
Jordan Adams
Elisa Aguilar 
Matee Ajavon 
Marcie Alberts
Markita Aldridge
Erin Alexander
Kayla Alexander
Tawona Alhaleem
Charel Allen
Rebecca Allen
Ameryst Alston
Mactabene Amachree 
Monique Ambers
Ambrosia Anderson
Chantelle Anderson
Jolene Anderson
Keisha Anderson
Mery Andrade
Yvette Angel
Kristine Anigwe
Nicky Anosike
Jayne Appel
Janeth Arcain
Anne Marie Armstrong
Katasha Artis
Marlies Askamp 
La'Tangela Atkinson
Morenike Atunrase
Seimone Augustus
Valériane Ayayi
Angela Aycock
Miranda Ayim
Leigh Aziz
Jennifer Azzi

B

Tricia Bader Binford
Sherill Baker
Alison Bales
Rhonda Banchero
Rachel Banham
Elena Baranova
LaQuanda Barksdale
Adia Barnes
Quacy Barnes
Mistie Bass
Suzy Batkovic-Brown
Jacqueline Batteast
Ashley Battle
Cass Bauer-Bilodeau
Vicki Baugh
Alana Beard
Ryneldi Becenti
Kimberly Beck
Kenisha Bell
Evgeniya Belyakova
Hind Ben Abdelkader 
Jenni Benningfield
Alex Bentley
Valeriya Berezhynska
Lucienne Berthieu
Morgan Bertsch
Tully Bevilaqua
Tiffany Bias
Jessica Bibby
Agnieszka Bibrzycka
Sue Bird
Abby Bishop
Nina Bjedov
Angie Bjorklund
Tera Bjorklund
Chante Black
Debbie Black
Rhonda Blades
Cindy Blodgett
Nikki Blue
Octavia Blue
Shannon Bobbitt
Whitney Boddie
Ruthie Bolton
LaToya Bond
Kelsey Bone
Susanna Bonfiglio
DeWanna Bonner
Karen Booker
Jenny Boucek
Kelly Boucher
Lindsay Bowen
Brittany Boyd
Carla Boyd
Crystal Bradford
Gennifer Brandon
Albena Branzova
Gergana Branzova
Cierra Bravard
Janice Braxton
Kara Braxton
Angie Braziel
Jessica Breland
Reshea Bristol
Michelle Brogan
Sandy Brondello
Cindy Brown
Coretta Brown
Edwina Brown
Kalani Brown
Kiesha Brown
La'Shawn Brown
Lesley Brown
Rushia Brown
Marla Brumfield
Jessica Brungo
Rebekkah Brunson
Adut Bulgak
Vicky Bullett
Cierra Burdick
Heather Burge
Heidi Burge
Annie Burgess
Linda Burgess
Kennedy Burke
Alisa Burras
Janell Burse
Heather Butler
Tasha Butts
Latasha Byears

C

Kelley Cain
Elizabeth Cambage
Edna Campbell
Michelle Campbell
Michelle Campbell
Dominique Canty
Jamie Carey
Bridget Carleton
Essence Carson
Amisha Carter
Arica Carter
Deborah Carter
Swin Cash
Jamie Cassidy
Iziane Castro Marques
Tamika Catchings
LaNeishea Caufield
Maite Cazorla
Elisabeth Cebrian
Keri Chaconas
Florencia Chagas 
Cori Chambers
Quianna Chaney
Jill Chapman-Daily
Daedra Charles
Tina Charles
Sonia Chase
Joy Cheek
Felicia Chester
Kaayla Chones
Kayte Christensen
Karima Christmas
Shameka Christon
Kristi Cirone
Layshia Clarendon
Alysha Clark
Margold Clark
Michelle Cleary
Courtney Clements
Stacy Clinesmith
Natasha Cloud
Claire Coggins
Monique Coker
Courtney Coleman
Marissa Coleman
Nadia Colhado
Katrina Colleton
Napheesa Collier
Sydney Colson
Megan Compain
Maria Conde
Andrea Congreaves
Cara Consuegra
Camille Cooper
Cynthia Cooper-Dyke
Kahleah Copper
Carla Cortijo
Sylvia Crawley
Willnett Crockett
Danielle Crockrom
Katie Cronin
Shanna Crossley
Cassandra Crumpton-Moorer
Anna Cruz
Beth Cunningham
Davalyn Cunningham
Sophie Cunningham
Monique Currie
Edniesha Curry

D

Ana Dabovic 
Stacey Dales-Schuman
Grace Daley
Damiris Dantas
Helen Darling
Jessica Davenport
Brandi Davis
Dee Davis
Tanae Davis-Cain
Clarissa Davis-Wrightsil
Erika de Souza 
Anna DeForge
Elena Delle Donne
Jennifer Derevjanik
Diamond Deshields
Keitha Dickerson
Blake Dietrick
Skylar Diggins
Cierra Dillard
Tai Dillard
Tamecka Dixon
Stefanie Dolson
Nadine Domond
Bethany Donaphin
Shay Doron 
Scholanda Robinson Dorrell
Cintia dos Santos 
Clarissa dos Santos
Katie Douglas
Jelena Dubljevic 
Megan Duffy
Celine Dumerc
Victoria Dunlap
Candice Dupree
Asia Durr
Margo Dydek

E

Michelle Edwards
Simone Edwards
Teresa Edwards
Tonya Edwards
Frida Eldebrink
Aaryn Ellenberg
Shyra Ely
Shalonda Enis
Summer Erb
Lauren Ervin
Dawn Evans

F

Trisha Fallon 
Kelly Faris
Barbara Farris
Jamierra Faulkner
Allison Feaster
Sui Feifei
Marie Ferdinand-Harris
Marta Fernandez
Marina Ferragut
Nirra Fields
Ukari Figgs
Isabelle Fijalkowski 
Olga Firsova
Milena Flores
Tye'sha Fluker
Kristin Folkl
Cheryl Ford
Kisha Ford
Stacey Ford
Toni Foster
Sylvia Fowles
Cayla Francis
Desiree Francis
A'Quonesia Franklin
Megan Frazee
Stacy Frese
La'Keshia Frett
Trina Frierson
Linda Frohlich 
Sam Fuehring
Candace Futrell

G

Katryna Gaither
Travesa Gant
Begona Garcia
Kerri Gardin
Andrea Gardner
Andrea Garner
Pietra Gay
Cornelia Gayden
Katie Gearlds
Jacki Gemelos
Kim Gessig
Kelley Gibson
Briana Gilbreath-Butler
Jennifer Gillom
Usha Gilmore
Kamela Gissendanner
Chrissy Givens
Emile Gomis
Sasha Goodlett
Angel Goodrich
Adrienne Goodson
Bridgette Gordon
Gillian Goring
Shaunzinski Gortman
Margo Graham
Erin Grant
Bashaara Graves
Denique Graves
Chelsea Gray
Reshanda Gray
Alexis Gray-Lawson
Michelle Greco
Kalana Greene
Nikki Greene
Cisti Greenwalt
Vedrana Grgin-Fonseca 
Kelsey Griffin
Yolanda Griffith 
Brittney Griner
Lady Grooms
Gordana Grubin
Sandrine Gruda 
Megan Gustafson
Wanda Guyton
Jazmon Gwathmey

H

Mikiko Hagiwara
Kamesha Hairston
Amber Hall
Vicki Hall
Angie Hamblin
Ruth Hamblin
Dearica Hamby
Becky Hammon
Keisha Hampton
Kym Hampton
Jennifer Hamson
Romana Hamzova
Alex Harden
Lindsey Harding
Laura Harper
Donna Harrington
Amber Harris
Fran Harris
Isabelle Harrison
Lisa Harrison
Kristi Harrower
Bria Hartley
Jasmine Hassell
Tianna Hawkins
Vanessa Hayden
Tiffany Hayes
Kristin Haynie
Dena Head
Nekeshia Henderson
Tracy Henderson
Sonja Henning
Aneika Henry
Amy Herrig
Katrina Hibbert
Jessie Hicks
Natisha Hiedeman
Allison Hightower
E. C. Hill
Tayler Hill
Korie Hlede
Roneeka Hodges
Ebony Hoffman
Chamique Holdsclaw
Kedra Holland-Corn
Quanitra Hollingsworth
Rachel Hollivay
Bria Holmes
Sequoia Holmes
Joy Holmes-Harris
Amber Holt
Jordan Hooper
Andrea Hoover
Kym Hope
Chelsea Hopkins
Susie Hopson-Shelton
Alexis Hornbuckle
Charde Houston
Ashley Houts
Anriel Howard
Jennifer Howard
Natasha Howard
Brittany Hrynko
Megan Huff
Tasha Humphrey

I

Ify Ibekwe
Sandora Irvin
Dalma Ivanyi
Niele Ivey

J

Angela Jackson
Chloe Jackson
Deanna Jackson
Gwen Jackson
Lauren Jackson
Tamicha Jackson
Tammy Jackson
Tia Jackson
Tiffany Jackson
Amber Jacobs
Jasmine James
Tamara James
Briann January
Rachel Jarry
Moriah Jefferson
Janeesa Jeffery
Anete Jekabsone-Zogota
Cathy Joens
Pollyanna Johns Kimbrough
Adrienne Johnson
Chandra Johnson
Glory Johnson
Jaclyn Johnson
LaTonya Johnson
Leslie Johnson
Niesa Johnson
Shannon Johnson
Shenise Johnson
Temeka Johnson
Tiffani Johnson
Vickie Johnson
Kellie Jolly Harper
Asjha Jones
Chandi Jones
Jameka Jones
Jonquel Jones
Larecha Jones
Marion Jones
Merlakia Jones
Carolyn Jones-Young
Pauline Jordan

K

Aneta Kausaite
Paris Kea
Shae Kelley
Crystal Kelly
Brianna Kiesel
Susan King Borchardt
Jae Kingi-Cross
Lynetta Kizer
Zuzi Klimesova
Whitney Knight
Ewelina Kobryn
Laurie Koehn
Ilona Korstin
Greta Koss
Anastasia Kostaki
Tanja Kostic
Cathrine Kraayeveld
Nicole Kubik
Andrea Kuklova

L

Alison Lacey
Jennifer Lacy
Natasha Lacy
Venus Lacy
Monica Lamb
Sheila Lambert
Betnijah Laney
MerleLynn Lange-Harris
Crystal Langhorne
Krystyna Lara
Erlana Larkins
Amanda Lassiter
Ivory Latta
Jantel Lavender
Kara Lawson
Edwige Lawson-Wade
Katarina Lazic
Shalee Lehning
Betty Lennox
Kiara Leslie
Lisa Leslie
Yelena Leuchanka
Nicole Levesque
Doneeka Lewis
Takeisha Lewis
Tynesha Lewis
Nancy Lieberman-Cline
Miao Lijie
Taylor Lilley
Jasmine Lister
Tricia Liston
Camille Little
Andrea Lloyd Curry
Rebecca Lobo
Samantha Logic
Stacey Lovelace
Jewell Loyd
Maggie Lucas
Pat Luckey
Helen Luz
Sancho Lyttle

M

Mwadi Mabika
Marina Mabrey
Victoria Macaulay
Laura Macchi
Clarisse Machanguana
Tess Madgen
Ezi Magbegor
Megan Mahoney
Shea Mahoney
Hamchetou Maiga-Ba
Nadine Malcolm
Sonja Mallory
Ally Malott
Evanthia Maltsi 
Kristen Mann
Sharon Manning
Rhonda Mapp
Michelle M. Marciniak
Gabriela Marginean 
Maylana Martin
Nuria Martinez 
Raffaella Masciadri 
A'dia Mathies
Caity Matter
Katie Mattera
Anita Maxwell
Monica Maxwell
Kelly Mazzante
Kayla McBride
Brandi McCain
Tiffany McCain
Rashanda McCants
Janel McCarville
Suzie McConnell Serio
Angel McCoughtry
Teaira McCowan
Danielle McCray
Nikki McCray
Nicky McCrimmon
Danielle McCulley
Pamela McGee
Imani McGee-Stafford
Carla McGhee
Nadirah McKenith
Shanece McKinney
Taj McWilliams-Franklin
Emma Meesseman
Chasity Melvin
Giuliana Mendiola
Britany Miller
Coco Miller
Kelly Miller
Macy Miller
Teana Miller
Tausha Mills
Jelena Milovanovic
DeLisha Milton-Jones
Leilani Mitchell
Liz Moeggenberg
Adriana Moises 
Chanel Mokango
Jacinta Monroe
Anna Montanana
Alex Montgomery
Renee Montgomery
Jackie Moore
Jessica Moore
Lindsey Moore
Loree Moore
Maya Moore
Navonda Moore
Penny Moore
Tamara Moore
Yolanda Moore
Carolyn Moos
Darxia Morris
Jene Morris
Ziomara Morrison 
Bernice Mosby
Brene Moseley
Judy Mosley-McAfee
Kaleena Mosqueda-Lewis
Jenny Mowe
Razija Mujanović
Naomi Mulitauaopele
Shay Murphy

N

 Christelle N'Garsanet
 Andrea Nagy 
 Chen Nan
 Astou Ndiaye-Diatta 
 Emmeline Ndongue 
 Astou Ndour
 Eva Nemcova 
 Claudia Neves 
 Chelsea Newton 
 Bernadette Ngoyisa 
 Tina Nicholson
 Marlous Nieuwveen 
 Mila Nikolich
 Chioma Nnamaka
  Deanna Nolan 
 Natalie Novosel
 Vanessa Nygaard

O

Jenna O'Hea
Jennifer O'Neill
Kristen O'Neill
Yuko Oga
Arike Ogunbowale
Chiney Ogwumike
Nneka Ogwumike
Nicole Ohlde
Abi Olajuwon
Inga Orekhova
Irina Osipova
Heather Owen
Shantia Owens

P

Danielle Page 
Murriel Page
Yolanda Paige
Sabrina Palie
Wendy Palmer-Daniel
Courtney Paris
Candace Parker
Cheyenne Parker
Florina Pascalau
Tia Paschal
Michaela Pavlickova
Kate Paye
Kayla Pedersen
Ticha Penicheiro
Jocelyn Penn
Jasmina Perazic-Gipe 
Jia Perkins
Erin Perperoglou
Kim Perrot
Devereaux Peters
Haley Peters
Sonja Petrovic 
Bridget Pettis
Erin Phillips
Porsha Phillips
Ta'Shia Phillips
Tari Phillips
Plenette Pierson
Theresa Plaisance
Jeanette Pohlen
Catarina Pollini
Cappie Pondexter
Chelsea Poppens
Angie Potthoff
Elaine Powell
Nicole Powell
Aerial Powers
Samantha Prahalis
Armintie Price
Franthea Price
Lynn Pride
Epiphanny Prince

Q

Brooke Queenan
Allie Quigley
Noelle Quinn
Texlin Quinney

R

Hajdana Radunovic 
Felicia Ragland
Semeka Randall
Kristen Rasmussen
Brittainey Raven
Stephanie Raymond
Jamie Redd
Katelan Redmon
Brandy Reed
Chastity Reed
Michelle Reed
Tracy Reid
Tammi Reiss
Kathrin Ress
Andrea Riley
Ruth Riley
Jennifer Rizzotti
Nyree Roberts
Angel Robinson
Ashley Robinson
Caliya Robinson
Crystal Robinson
Danielle Robinson
Renee Robinson
Sugar Rodgers
Jannon Roland
Waltiea Rolle
Leticia Romero 
Adrienne Ross
Tierra Ruffin-Pratt
Leah Rush
Mercedes Russell
Eugenia Rycraw

S

Nykesha Sales
Ángela Salvadores
Sheri Sam
Charisse Sampson
Katie Lou Samuelson
Isabel Sanchez
Amy Sanders
LaToya Sanders
Nakia Sanford
Olayinka Sanni
Kelly Santos
Alessandra Santos de Oliveira
Rankica Sarenac
Paige Sauer
Jaynetta Saunders
Audrey Sauret
Laure Savasta
Shoni Schimmel
Kelly Schumacher
Georgia Schweitzer
Olympia Scott
Raegan Scott
Elena Shakirova
K.B. Sharp
Chay Shegog
Jessica Shepard
Ashley Shields
Adrienne Shuler
Meighan Simmons
Dymond Simon
Odyssey Sims
Madinah Slaise
Gwen Slaughter
Gergana Slavtcheva
Aiysha Smith
Alanna Smith
Brooke Smith
Charlotte Smith
Charmin Smith
Christy Smith
Crystal Smith
Jennifer Smith
Katie Smith
Kim Smith
LaCharlotte Smith
Tangela Smith
Tyresa Smith
Wanisha Smith
Belinda Snell
Michelle Snow
Leila Sobral
Sidney Spencer
Rachael Sporn
Trisha Stafford-Odom
Dawn Staley
Tiffany Stansbury
Kate Starbird
Katy Steding
Maria Stepanova
Rehema Stephens
Stacy Stephens
Mandisa Stevenson
Breanna Stewart
Jackie Stiles
Valerie Still
Andrea Stinson
Shanele Stires
Tamara Stocks
Kiah Stokes
Jurgita Streimikyte
Shekinna Stricklen
Ann Strother
Tora Suber
Laura Summerton
Jung Sun-Min
Tammy Sutton-Brown
Ketia Swanier
Sheryl Swoopes
Carolyn Swords
April Sykes

T

Stephanie Talbot
Zane Tamane
Sonja Tate
Diana Taurasi
Asia Taylor
Lindsay Taylor
Penny Taylor
Nikki Teasley
Kasha Terry
Alyssa Thomas
Carla Thomas
Christi Thomas
Jasmine Thomas
Krystal Thomas
LaToya Thomas
Stacey Thomas
Alicia Thompson
Amanda Thompson
Tina Thompson
Shona Thorburn
Erin Thorn
Kayla Thornton
Robin Threatt
Iciss Tillis
Michele Timms
Joslyn Tinkle
Ramu Tokashiki
Penny Toler
Kristi Toliver
Marianna Tolo
Elena Tornikidou
Levys Torres
Tiffany Travis
Chantel Tremitiere
Trena Trice
Morgan Tuck
Barbara Turner
Brianna Turner
Molly Tuter
Slobodanka Tuvic
Polina Tzekova

U

 Mfon Udoka
 Petra Ujhelyi
 Itoro Umoh-Coleman

V

 Amaya Valdemoro
 Michele Van Gorp
 Courtney Vandersloot
 Alexandra Van Embricqs
 Kia Vaughn
 Krystal Vaughn
 Kristen Veal
 Jana Vesela
 Danielle Viglione
 Daliborka Vilipić 
 Kamila Vodichkova
 Natalia Vodopyanova
 Milica Vukadinović

W

Ashley Walker
Ayana Walker
DeMya Walker
Marcedes Walker
Megan Walker
Maren Walseth
Avery Warley
Coquese Washington
Tonya Washington
Ann Wauters
Teresa Weatherspoon
Umeki Webb
Martina Weber
Kendra Wecker
Jamie Weisner
Lindsay Whalen
Erica Wheeler
DeTrina White
Erica White
Stephanie White
Tan White
Val Whiting-Raymond
Tamika Whitmore
Khadijah Whittington
Jenny Whittle
Davellyn Whyte
Sue Wicks
Jamila Wideman
Candice Wiggins
Brittany Wilkins
Angelina Williams
Beverly Williams
Courtney Williams
Debra Williams
Elizabeth Williams
Gabby Williams
Kamiko Williams
Kiana Williams
Kim Williams
Lenae Williams
Natalie Williams
Riquna Williams
Rita Williams
Shaquala Williams
Tamika Williams
Tara Williams
Toccara Williams
Adrian Williams-Strong
Le'coe Willingham
Lisa Willis
Wendi Willits
A'ja Wilson
Christina Wirth
Lindsay Wisdom-Hylton
Sophia Witherspoon
Julie Wojta
Kara Wolters
Angelina Wolvert
Lynette Woodard
Tiffany Woosley
Monica Wright
Shereka Wright
Tanisha Wright
Brooke Wyckoff
Dana Wynne

X
  Marta Xargay
Han Xu

Y

 Lindsey Yamasaki
 Corissa Yasen
 Nevriye Yılmaz
Jackie Young
  Sophia Young
 Tamera Young
 Toni Young
Li Yueru

Z

 Amanda Zahui B.
 Oksana Zakaluzhnaya
 Francesca Zara
  Shavonte Zellous
 Haixia Zheng
 Zuzana Žirková
 Sharnee Zoll

External links
WNBA player index